The People of Hemsö (Swedish: Hemsöborna) is a 1955 Swedish historical drama film directed by Arne Mattsson and starring Erik Strandmark, Hjördis Petterson and Nils Hallberg. It marked the screen debut of Daliah Lavi, then a child actress. The film's sets were designed by the art director Bibi Lindström.  It was based on the 1887 novel The People of Hemsö by August Strindberg, previously adapted into a 1944 film of the same title.

Cast
 Erik Strandmark as 	Carlsson
 Hjördis Petterson as 	Madame Flod
 Nils Hallberg as Gusten
 John Norrman as 	Rundquist
 Curt Löwgren as Norman
 Ulla Sjöblom as 	Clara, maid
 Birgitta Pettersson as 	Lotten, maid
 Douglas Håge as 	Nordström
 Georg Rydeberg as 	Professor
 Ulla Holmberg as 	Professor's Wife
 Daliah Lavi as 	Professor's Daughter
 Margit Carlqvist as 	Ida, maid
 Stig Johanson as 	Farm-hand
 John Melin as 	Rapp
 Birger Åsander as 	Farm-hand
 Wiktor Andersson as 	Verger 
 Artur Cederborgh as 	Man on the bridge 
 Ivar Wahlgren as 	Captain

References

Bibliography 
 Cowie, Peter. Swedish Cinema, from Ingeborg Holm to Fanny and Alexander. Swedish Institute, 1985.

External links 
 

1955 films
1955 drama films
1950s Swedish-language films
Films directed by Arne Mattsson
Films set in the 1880s
Swedish historical drama films
1950s historical drama films
Films based on Swedish novels
Films based on works by August Strindberg
1950s Swedish films